Horseshoe Falls (Welsh: Rhaeadr y Bedol) is a weir on the River Dee near Llantysilio Hall in Denbighshire, Wales, about  north-west of the town of Llangollen.

History
The canal west of Pontcysyllte Aqueduct and the construction of the weir were authorised by an Act of Parliament obtained in 1804 by the Ellesmere Canal Company. The canal was a navigable feeder, which supplied water to the Ellesmere Canal beyond Pontcysyllte, and to the Chester Canal, to which it connected near Nantwich. Thomas Telford was the civil engineer responsible for the design, and the canal and feeder were completed in 1808.

The weir was an important factor in the retention of the canal to Llangollen when the owners of the entire Shropshire Union system, the London, Midland and Scottish Railway, decided to close much of the network in 1944. They retained the line of the former Chester Canal and the Ellesmere Canal from Nantwich to Ellesmere Port, the branch of the Chester Canal to Middlewich and the former Birmingham and Liverpool Junction Canal main line from Nantwich to Wolverhampton. Because Horseshoe Falls was a major source of water to that system, the canal from Llangollen to Nantwich, including the great aqueducts at Pontcysyllte and Chirk, was retained purely as a water supply channel. This action enabled the canal to survive until it was taken over by British Waterways following nationalisation in 1948. With the steady decline in commercial traffic, British Waterways negotiated with the Mid and South East Cheshire Water Board, and the canal is used to transfer water from the Dee at Llantysilio to a reservoir near Hurleston Junction, to the north of Nantwich. Under British Waterways, the canal has become one of the most popular cruising canals in the country. The final  from Llangollen to the Falls is not navigable by motorised boats, as it is not wide enough for vessels to turn round, but the towpath extends along the bank right up to the Falls.

The canal was awarded World Heritage status because of the bold civil engineering solutions needed to construct a canal with no locks through such difficult terrain.

See also

Canals of the United Kingdom
History of the British canal system

Bibliography

References

External links

Details & photo

 

Waterfalls of Denbighshire
Weirs in Wales
Weirs on the River Dee, Wales
Works of Thomas Telford
Llangollen Canal
River Dee, Wales